Youthquake 

 Youthquake, a significant cultural, political, or social change arising from the actions or influence of young people; see Oxford Dictionaries' Word of the Year for 2017
 Youthquake (movement), a cultural movement
Youthquake! a 1977 film about rock music and religion
 Youthquake (album), album from Dead or Alive
 Youthquake, a character in the comic book Justice Machine